Woodbourne is a historic plantation house located near Roxobel, Bertie County, North Carolina. The two-story, frame main block was built about 1810, with one-story frame wings added in 1819.  The front facade features a temple form, two-story, three-bay central pedimented pavilion.  It is sheathed in weatherboard and sits on a brick foundation. Also on the property is a contributing dairy.

It was added to the National Register of Historic Places in 1971.

References

Plantation houses in North Carolina
Houses on the National Register of Historic Places in North Carolina
Houses completed in 1819
Houses in Bertie County, North Carolina
National Register of Historic Places in Bertie County, North Carolina